The 1918–19 Ohio Bobcats men's basketball team represented Ohio University. Frank Gullum was the head coach for Ohio. The Bobcats played their home games in Ohio Gymnasium.

Schedule

|-
!colspan=9 style=| Regular Season

References

 Ohio Record Book
 Ohio Basketball at 100
 OAC History

Ohio Bobcats men's basketball seasons
Ohio
Ohio Bobcats
Ohio Bobcats